Half Brother may refer to:
 Half brother
 Half Brother (band), an English pop rock band
 Half Brother (album)
 The Half Brother, a 2001 novel by Lars Saabye Christensen

See also
 Half Brothers, a comedy directed by Luke Greenfield